Hypolimnas misippus, the Danaid eggfly, mimic, or diadem, is a widespread species of nymphalid butterfly. It is well known for polymorphism and mimicry. Males are blackish with distinctive white spots that are fringed in blue. Females are in multiple forms that include male-like forms while others closely resemble the toxic butterflies Danaus chrysippus and Danaus plexippus.

Distribution
They are found across Africa, Asia, and Australia. In the Americas, they are found in the West Indies, with strays in Central and North America.

Description

The male has the upperwings dark velvety brownish black. The forewing has a broad white oval spot between veins 3 and 7. A smaller spot near the apex is also present. These spots are crossed by the black veins and bordered in iridescent blue that is visible only at certain angles. The hindwing has a larger white spot but the veins crossing it are yellowish and not as prominent as on the forewing. There are some white specks along the tornus and the margin is edged with white and black.

Underside forewing: bases of interspaces 1 and 2 and cell rich light chestnut, discal area fuscous brown; apical half golden brown; basal half of costal margin flecked with white: cell anteriorly black with three white spots; a narrow, transverse, very short, white mark beyond apex of cell; a very broad, somewhat oval, white discal patch from costa to middle of interspace 2 edged with diffuse dusky black; the preapical white spot as on the upperside but not surrounded with blue, continued posteriorly as a transverse series of small postdiscal white spots; an inner and an outer transverse series of white lunules divided by a sinuous black line followed by a terminal black line.

Hindwing: basal and postdiscal areas chestnut-red; a black spot at base of vein 8 defined by white lines; a very broad medio-discal white band from costa to dorsum, crossed at apex of interspace 1 a by a transverse black mark, beyond the middle of interspace 7 by a broad black bar, and in interspace 7 bordered inwardly by black; a postdiscal series of small white spots in continuation of those on the forewing; an inner subterminal series of paired subtriangular small white spots, an outer subterminal line of slender white lunules, an intervening black sinuous line between the two series and a black terminal line. Cilia of both forewings and hindwings white alternated with black. Antennae, head, thorax and abdomen dark brown; beneath, the palpi and thorax white, the abdomen chestnut.

Female – polymorphic:

First form: Upperside rich tawny. Forewing: the costa, the apical half of the wing and the termen black, the inner margin of this black area follows a line crossing the cell obliquely and curving round to near apex of interspace 1 a; a white spot beyond apex of cell; an oblique band of elongate white spots, a more transverse short subapical series of three or four much smaller white spots, and an inner and an outer sub-terminal transverse series of very small slender white lunules.

Hindwing: a transverse round spot in interspace 7, the terminal margin broadly black, the latter traversed by two transverse series of paired small white lunules. Cilia of forewings and hindwings white alternated with black. Underside paler tawny yellow, the disc of the forewing deeper tawny; the markings are much as on the upperside but differ as follows: Forewing: three white spots along the anterior margin of cell, the black on the apical area beyond the oblique band of white spots replaced by golden. Hindwing: a black spot at base of vein 8, another at base of interspace 5, and a postdiscal transverse series of small white spots in addition to the markings as on the upperside.

Second form: Similar to the above but the disc of the hindwing on both upper and under sides white, =alcippoides, Butler.

Third form: Similar to the first form, but on the forewing the oblique series of: elongate spots yellowish and the middle portion of the black apical area tawny.

Life cycle
Larva: de la Chaumette (teste Moore) describes this as cylindrical, black, with a darker black dorsal line, banded transversely with pale brown transverse tuberculated small spots; beneath dark olive-brown; legs and head brick-red; head furnished with two long black thick branched spines; the rest of the segments except the anal with ten branched spines, dirty, transparent white in colour and disposed in longitudinal rows, anal segment with two similar spines.

Food plant: Portulaca oleracea, Asystasia lawiana.

Pupa: Pendulous. Short and thick; light brown, without metallic spots, variegated and streaked with bistre, particularly towards the head and tail. (de la Chaumette.)

Mimicry 
The females H. misippus mimic (in appearance) the similar-sized Plain Tiger, a toxic butterfly with the toxic Milkweed as its host plant. The vibrant colours of the Plain Tiger advertise its unpalatable nature to predators around, so the Danaid female sends out the same signal, regardless of it not being toxic

To aid this behaviour, the females also sometimes tend to move with plain tiger butterflies. There are very minute differences in appearance of the two butterflies.

Larval Host Plants 

 Asystasia gangetica
 Asystasia lawiana
 Barleria cristata
 Justicia betonica
 Ipomoea carnea
 Abelmoschus 
 Abutilon 
 Hibiscus 
 Sida cordifolia
 Portulaca oleracea
 Portulaca pilosa

Life Stages

References

Misippus
Butterflies of Asia
Butterflies of Europe
Butterflies of Oceania
Butterflies of Australia
Lepidoptera of Cape Verde
Insects of the Dominican Republic
Butterflies described in 1764
Taxa named by Carl Linnaeus